This is a list of notable colleges in Mumbai. Many of the colleges iare Autonomous universitys while others are affiliated to the University of Mumbai. Colleges and are spread throughout the city as well as the suburbs.Poplar courses include  BA, BSc, and BCom are popular courses. Many colleges also offer professional courses which concentrate on a specialized field. Almost all colleges  offer courses at Junior college level, which is equivalent to last 2 years of high schools in other countries.

The Junior colleges are governed by the Maharashtra State Board for Secondary and Higher Secondary Education.

Arts, Science & Commerce 

 Bhavan's College of Arts, Science and Commerce, Andheri West
 Bunts Sangha's S.M.Shetty College of Science, Commerce and Management Studies, Powai
B. K. Birla College of Arts, Science and Commerce,Kalyan
 Chetana College,
 C. H. M. College, Ulhasnagar
 D. G. Ruparel College of Arts, Science and Commerce, Matunga
 Elphinstone College, Kala Ghoda, Fort
 Guru Nanak Khalsa College (King's Circle), Matunga
 H.R. College of Commerce and Economics, Churchgate
 Jai Hind College, Churchgate
 Kalasadan, Sion
 Kishinchand Chellaram College, Churchgate
 R. D. National College, Bandra West
 M. M. K. College, Bandra West
 Kirti M. Doongursee College, Dadar West
 K.J. Somaiya College of Arts & Commerce, Vidyavihar
 K.J. Somaiya College of Science & Commerce, Vidyavihar
 Malini Kishor Sanghvi College of Commerce & Economics, JVPD, Vile Parle
 Mithibai College, Vile Parle
 Mulund College of Commerce, Mulund West
 Hinduja College, Charni Road
 N.G. Aacharya and D.K Marathe College of Arts, Science and Commerce, Chembur 
 Nagindas Khandwal College of Commerce and Economics, Malad
 Narsee Monjee College of Commerce and Economics, Vile Parle West
 NES Ratnam College Of Arts, Science & Commerce, Bhandup
 Patkar-Varde College, Goregaon
 Jashbhai Maganbhai Patel College of Commerce, Goregaon
 Ramnarain Ruia College, Matunga
 Ramniranjan Anandilal Podar College of Commerce and Economics, Matunga
 Ramniranjan Jhunjhunwala College of Arts, Science & Commerce.
 Royal College of Science, Arts and Commerce, Mira Road
 Shree L. R. Tiwari Degree College of Arts,Commerce and Science, Mira Bhayandar
 Smt. K. L. Tiwari Degree College of Commerce and Science Nalasopara West
 Sanpada College of Commerce and Technology, Sanpada
 Sathaye College, formerly Parle College, Vile Parle
 Shri M.D. Shah Mahila College of Arts and Commerce, Malad West
 Siddharth College of Arts Science and Commerce, Buddha Bhavan, Fort
 Siddharth College of Commerce and Economics, Anand Bhavan, Fort
 SIES College of Arts, Science, and Commerce, Sion West
 SIES College of Commerce and Economics, Sion East
 SIES (Nerul) College of Arts, Science and Commerce, Nerul
 S.K. Somaiya College of Arts & Sciences, Vidyavihar
 South Indians' Welfare Society College, Wadala
 SPDT Lions Juhu College of Arts, Commerce and Science, Mumbai, Andheri East
 St. Andrew's College, Bandra
 St. Xavier's College, Dhobitalao, Fort
 Swami Vivekanand International Schools
 Sydenham College of Commerce and Economics, Churchgate
 Thakur College of Science and Commerce, Thakur Village, Kandivali
 Tolani College of Commerce, Andheri
 Vani Vidyalaya High School and Junior College, Mulund West
 VIVA College of Arts, Science and Commerce, Virar
 Wilson College, Girgaon
 Shailesh J. Mehta School Of Management IIT Bombay  [SJMSOM] Mumbai
 Rajiv Gandhi College of Arts,Commerce & Science Vashi
 Seth N.K.T.T College of commerce arts and science, kharkaralii road Thane West

Engineering

Hotel management
Apeejay Institute of Hospitality, CBD Belapur
ICE College of Hotel Management and Catering Technology, Andheri
ICE College of Hotel Management and Catering Technology, Nerul
IHM Mumbai, Dadar west
Rustomjee Academy for Global Careers, Dahanu
Sheila Raheja Institute of Hotel Management, Bandra East

Law

 School of Law, University of Mumbai, Mumbai
 G. J. Advani Law College, Bandra
 Government Law College, Churchgate
 K C Law College, Churchgate
 Maharashtra National Law University, Mumbai
 Shree L.R. Tiwari College of Law, Mira Bhayandar
 Siddharth College of Law, Anand Bhavan, Fort

Management

Pharmacy
 Institute of Chemical Technology, Matunga (Autonomous)
 Dr L H HIranandani College of Pharmacy, Ulhasnagar
 Anjuman I Islam S Kalsekar Technical Campus School Of Pharmacy, New Panvel
 Bharati Vidyapeeth College Of Pharmacy C B D Belapur Navi Mumbai
 Bombay college Of Pharmacy Kalina Santacruz East Mumbai
 C U Shah College Of Pharmacy
 Dr Bhanuben Nanavati College Of Pharmacy 
 Gahlot Institute Of Pharmacy, Koper Khairane
 H K College Of Pharmacy, Jogeshwari
 Ideal College Of Pharmacy and Research,  Kalyan
 Ideal Institute Of Pharmacy, Wada
 K M Kundnani College Of Pharmacy, Cuffe Parade Colaba Mumbai
 Konan Gyanpeeth Rahul Dharkar College Of Pharmacy And Research Institute, Karjat
 Viva Institute Of Pharmacy
 Mumbai Educational Trusts Institute Of Pharmacy Degree
 Ncrds Sterling Institute Of Pharmacy, Nerul, Navi Mumbai

Vocational institutes
 Rustomjee Academy for Global Careers, Thane
Garware Institute of Career Education & Development, Kalina - Certificate course in Commerce
ICE College of Hotel Management and Catering Technology, Mumbra
JD Institute of Fashion Technology

References

External links
 

Education in Navi Mumbai
Education in Mumbai
Mumbai
Mumbai-related lists